The Montagnulaceae are a family of fungi in the order Pleosporales.

References

Pleosporales